Thomas Gillingham,  D.D. was  an English Anglican priest in the 16th century.

Gillingham was educated at Corpus Christi College, Oxford.
  He held livings in Colchester, Barkway and Wheldrake. Langridge became Rector of Barcombe and  Archdeacon of Chichester in 1576.</ref>

Notes

1613 deaths
17th-century English people
Archdeacons of Chichester
Alumni of Corpus Christi College, Oxford